The following is a list of reptiles of Thailand. There are more than 400 species recorded.

Order Crocodylia (crocodilians)

Order Testudines (turtles)

Order Squamata, Suborder Lacertilia (lizards)

Order Squamata, Suborder Serpentes (snakes)

Common species
Reptile species commonly found in anthropogenically modified environments (i.e., near human settlements) include:
Calotes versicolor (oriental garden lizard)
Eutropis macularia (bronze grass skink)
Eutropis multifasciata (common sun skink)
Gekko gecko (tokay gecko)
Gehyra mutilata (stump-toed gecko)
Hemidactylus frenatus (common house gecko)
Hemidactylus platyurus (flat-tailed house gecko)
Ramphotyphlops braminus (common blind snake)
Python reticulatus (reticulated python)
Dendrelaphis pictus (painted bronzeback)
Enhydris plumbea (rice paddy snake)
Ptyas mucosa (oriental ratsnake)
Rhabdophis subminiatus (red-necked keelback)
Bungarus fasciatus (banded krait)

See also
List of amphibians of Thailand
List of birds of Thailand
List of mammals of Thailand
List of butterflies of Thailand
List of non-marine molluscs of Thailand
List of species native to Thailand

References

Thailand
Reptiles
Thailand